A bootloop (also named boot loop or boot-loop) is a problem that occurs on computing devices which are unable to complete the regular booting sequence and reboot before it is finished.

Examples 

 Windows NT 4.0
 Windows 2000
 Windows Server
 Windows 10
 The Nexus 5X
 Android 10: when setting a specific image as wallpaper, the luminance value exceeded the maximum of 255 which happened due to a rounding error during conversion from sRGB to RGB. This then crashed the SystemUI component on every boot.
 Google Nest hub

See also 

 LG smartphone bootloop issues
 Bootloader
 Blue screen of death

References 

Technological failures